John N. McMahon (born July 3, 1929) is a former senior U.S. official of the Central Intelligence Agency.

Background

John Norman McMahon was born on July 3, 1929, in East Norwalk, Connecticut.  His parents were Frederick Francis McMahon and Elizabeth Collins.  In 1951, he obtained a bachelor's degree from the College of Holy Cross.

Career

CIA

McMahon joined the CIA in 1951 or 1966.

He served as Deputy Director for Operations from January 11, 1978, to April 12, 1981, and later, nominated by US President Ronald Reagan, as Deputy Director of Central Intelligence under Director William J. Casey as of April 27, 1982, succeeding Bobby Ray Inman. Questioning McMahon during his nomination included US Senators Daniel Patrick Moynihan (who guided publication of the VENONA papers in the mid-1990s.

On March 4, 1986, McMahon, age 56, resigned and left office on March 26, succeeded by Robert M. Gates.  "McMahon had clashed with Capitol Hill conservatives who considered him less than zealous in his support of aid to guerrilla fighters in Afghanistan and Nicaragua."   President Reagan expressed regret at his resignation.

Lockheed Martin

In August 1986, McMahon joined Lockheed Martin Corporation as an executive vice president for plans and programs in its Missiles & Space Company.  In 1995, McMahon was president and CEO of Lockheed Missiles & Space Co.

In 2004, McMahon was registered as a lobbyist for the Lockheed Martin Corporation.

Awards

 1995:  Distinguished Public Service Medal from NASA

Personal life

On April 15, 1952, McMahon married Margaret Joan Hugger; they had three children. Connections
Married Margaret Joan Hugger, April 15, 1952. Children: Patricia Joy, Christopher John, Timothy Richard, Peter Collins.

Father:
Frederick Francis McMahon
Mother:
Elizabeth (Collins) McMahon
Spouse:
Margaret Joan Hugger
child:
Timothy Richard McMahon
child:
Patricia Joy McMahon
child:
Peter Collins McMahon
child:
Christopher John McMahon

References

External sources

 Wilson Center: JOHN N. MCMAHON, DEPUTY DIRECTOR FOR NATIONAL FOREIGN ASSESSMENT, TO AMBASSADOR RICHARD T. KENNEDY, UNDER SECRETARY OF STATE FOR MANAGEMENT, 'SPECIAL NATIONAL INTELLIGENCE ESTIMATE ON INDIAN REACTIONS TO NUCLEAR DEVELOPMENTS IN PAKISTAN,' 31-32/81
 U.S. Senate: Nomination of John N. McMahon: Hearing Before the Select Committee on Intelligence of the United States Senate, Ninety-seventh Congress, Second Session, on Nomination of John N. McMahon to be Deputy Director of Central Intelligence (May 26, 27, 1982)
 US Department of State:  Memorandum From the Deputy Director of Central Intelligence (McMahon) to the Deputy Director for Intelligence (Gates) (1982)
 Central Intelligence Agency:  Statement of John N. McMahon, Deputy Director of Central Intelligence (April 13, 1984)
 Central Intelligence Agency:  An Interview with Former DDCI John N. McMahon (1997-1998)

Deputy Directors of the Central Intelligence Agency
1929 births
Living people